Because of You is a Philippine television drama romantic comedy series broadcast by GMA Network. Directed by Mark A. Reyes and Ricky Davao, it stars Carla Abellana, Rafael Rosell and Gabby Concepcion. It premiered on November 30, 2015 on the network's Telebabad line up replacing Beautiful Strangers. The series concluded on May 13, 2016 with a total of 117 episodes. It was replaced by Juan Happy Love Story in its timeslot.

The series is streaming online on YouTube.

Premise
When Oliver left the altar when he and Andrea were about to marry each other, Andrea's life takes a turn. While Jaime's wife breaks up with him, the lives of Andrea and Jaime eventually cross path, and their work and family begin to intertwine into their relationship.

Cast and characters

Lead cast
 Carla Abellana as Andrea "Andi" Marquez-Salcedo
 Rafael Rosell as Oliver Dictado
 Gabby Concepcion as Jaime Salcedo

Supporting cast
 Kuh Ledesma as Charina Santiago
 Iya Villania as Maria Rebecca "Becca" Reyes 
 Valerie Concepcion as Veronica Sodico-Salcedo
 Joyce Ching as Francheska "Cheska" Sodico Salcedo
 Bettina Carlos as Patricia Sanchez
 Enzo Pineda as Sonny Lacson
 Vaness del Moral as Alexandra "Alex" Tamayo
 Michael Flores as Dennis Dela Peña
 Rey "PJ" Abellana as Conrado Marquez
 Carlo Gonzales as Henry 
 Julius Escarga as Michael Sodico Salcedo
 Sofia Pablo as Candy Sodico Salcedo
 Jacob Briz as Iñigo Sodico Salcedo
 Celia Rodriguez as Feliza Salcedo

Recurring cast
 Eunice Lagusad as Iska Larrazabal
 Mosang as Malou
 Shermaine Santiago as Clarisse
 Betong Sumaya as Albert
 Jackie Lou Blanco as Lucille Rodriguez
 Avery Paraiso as Chandler Rodriguez
 Kristofer Martin as Jonathan "Onat" Larrazabal / Nate
 Maey Bautista as Honey
 Oli Espino as Mang Nestor
 Frencheska Farr as Molly
 Lance Serrano as Randy
 Maureen Larrazabal as Love Co

Guest cast
 Mickey Ferriols as Mildred Samaniego / Margaret
 Arny Ross as Lizzy Torres
 Leni Santos as Marissa

Ratings
According to AGB Nielsen Philippines' Mega Manila household television ratings, the pilot episode of Because of You earned a 19.8% rating. While the final episode scored a 19.6% rating.

Accolades

References

External links
 
 

2015 Philippine television series debuts
2016 Philippine television series endings
Filipino-language television shows
GMA Network drama series
Philippine romantic comedy television series
Television shows set in the Philippines